Marta Esther Rocafort y Altuzarra, later hyphenated Rocafort-Altuzarra (18 September 1913 – 4 February 1993) was the second wife of the Count of Covadonga (previously known as Alfonso, Prince of Asturias).

Rocafort, a fashion model, was the eldest daughter of Blas Manuel Rocafort y González, a prominent Cuban dentist, and wife Rogelia Altuzarra y Carbonell. Her siblings were Elvira and Blas Rocafort y Altuzarra, later hyphenated Rocafort-Altuzarra.

Rocafort began dating the Count in New York City before his first marriage to Edelmira Sampedro y Robato ended.

On 3 July 1937, the Count married Rocafort-Atuzarrra in a civil wedding at the Spanish Embassy in Havana, Cuba, attended by the President of Cuba, Federico Laredo Brú. Two months later they separated and on 8 January 1938, they were divorced in New York City.

She then married the Miami millionaire, Thomas E. H. "Tommy" Atkins, Jr. at the Central Baptist Church in Miami on 19 March 1938. Her former husband died six months later in Miami on 6 September 1938.

Marta Atkins married a third time to Rodolfo Caballero.

Her nephew is the Spanish fashion designer Juanjo Rocafort (Juan José Rocafort Huete).

References

 Anuario Social de La Habana 1939, (Havana, Cuba: Luz-Hilo S.A., 1939) 
 "Covadonga Flown to Florida", The New York Times,  29 November 1937, page 5
 "Covadonga Divorce Given; Former Spanish King's Son and Cuban Wife Are Separated", The New York Times, 9 January 1938 page 40
 "Hace Siete Decadas Dos Cubanas Fueron Princesas de Asturias", El Nuevo Herald,  23 May 2004, Page PAGE: 4A 
 "Countess Covadonga Wed To Law Student; Former Wife of Son of Alfonso of Spain Married in Miami to E. H. Adkins Jr.", The New York Times,  19 March 1938, Page 16

Spanish royalty
1913 births
1993 deaths
Cuban emigrants to the United States